Owen Davidson and Billie Jean King were the defending champions, but Davidson did not compete. King partnered with Tony Roche but withdrew in the third round.

Marty Riessen and Margaret Court defeated Allan Stone and Betty Stöve in the final, 6–4, 7–5 to win the mixed doubles tennis title at the 1975 Wimbledon Championships.

Seeds

  Marty Riessen /  Margaret Court (champions)
  Tony Roche /  Billie Jean King (third round)
  Jan Kodeš /  Martina Navrátilová (semifinals)
  Alex Metreveli /  Olga Morozova (semifinals)

Draw

Finals

Top half

Section 1

Section 2

Bottom half

Section 3

Section 4

References

External links

1975 Wimbledon Championships – Doubles draws and results at the International Tennis Federation

X=Mixed Doubles
Wimbledon Championship by year – Mixed doubles